Pietro Tabarrani (1702– 1779) was an Italian physician and professor of Anatomy at the University of Siena.

Biography
He was born in Lombrici (Camaiore) in the Republic of Lucca. He found patronage with Cardinal Salviati in Rome, where he studied anatomy. From there he moved to Bologna, where he became friends with the doctors Beccari and Galeazzi. He then moved to Padua to work under the renowned anatomist Morgagni. In 1759, he obtained a professorship in the University of Siena. He would die in Siena in 1779, and his pupil Paolo Mascagni would take his position. His Observatione Anatomiche was published in Lucca in 1733.

References

1702 births
1779 deaths
People from Pisa
Italian anatomists
18th-century Italian physicians
Academic staff of the University of Siena